The 2016–17 Nicholls State Colonels men's basketball team represented Nicholls State University during the 2016–17 NCAA Division I men's basketball season. The Colonels, led by first-year head coach Richie Riley, played their home games at Stopher Gym in Thibodaux, Louisiana as members of the Southland Conference. They finished the season 14–17, 7–11 in Southland play to finish in a five-way tie for eighth place. They failed to qualify for the Southland tournament. Senior forward Liam Thomas led Division I in blocks per game with a 4.19 average.

Previous season
The Colonels finished the 2015–16 season with a record of 11–23, 6–12 in Southland play to finish in a three-way tie for ninth place. They defeated McNeese State in the first round of the Southland tournament to advance to the quarterfinals where they lost to Sam Houston State.

On March 29, 2016, head coach J. P. Piper was fired. He finished at Nicholls State with a 12-year record of 132–224. On April 27, the school announced that Richie Riley had been hired as head coach.

Offseason 
Coach Riley announced his assistant coaches on June 6, 2016. The new assistant coaches were John Aiken, Marlon Terry, and Austin Claunch.

Roster

Schedule and results

|-
!colspan=9 style=| Non-conference regular season

|-
!colspan=9 style=| Southland Conference regular season

References

Nicholls Colonels men's basketball seasons
Nicholls State
Nicholls State Colonels men's basketball
Nicholls State Colonels men's basketball